Río de los Remedios is a station on Line B of the Mexico City Metro system.  It is located on the Anillo Periférico and Boulevard Río de los Remedios in the Colonia Valle de Aragón 2a. Sección neighborhood of the Nezahualcóyotl municipality in Mexico State.

The station was opened on 30 November 2000.

Ridership

References

External links
 
 

Mexico City Metro Line B stations
Railway stations opened in 2000
Ciudad Nezahualcóyotl
2000 establishments in Mexico
Mexico City Metro stations outside Mexico City
Accessible Mexico City Metro stations